"Goteo" is a song by Argentine rapper Duki. It was released on August 6, 2019. The music video for the song has more than 100 million views on YouTube. The song has over 160 million plays on Spotify. In 2020 the song was nominated for 21st Annual Latin Grammy Awards in the category Best Rap/Hip-Hop Song.

Background
The song was produced by Asan, the video for the song was directed by Dano and recorded by Zazo Canvas, Nico Leonardo and Dano. The video was recorded in Barcelona when Duki performed at the Razzmatazz in 2019.

Remix
The remix of the song was released on January 23, 2020 that features the participation of C.R.O, Ronny J, Capo Plaza and Pablo Chill-E. The remix of the song was nominated in 2020 for the Gardel Awards in the category "Best Urban/Trap Musical Collaboration".

Personnel
Primary artist
Duki — lead vocals
Additional personnel
Asan — producer
El Sidechain — mixing 
Remix version
C.R.O — guest vocals
Ronny J — guest vocals
Pablo Chill-E — guest vocals
Capo Plaza — guest vocals

Charts

Weekly charts

Year-end charts

Certifications

Awards and accolades

See also
 List of Billboard Argentina Hot 100 top-ten singles in 2019

References

2019 singles
2019 songs
Argentine songs
Duki (rapper) songs
Songs written by Duki (rapper)
Argentina Hot 100 Top Ten Singles